The first organised game of competitive wheelchair Australian rules football was played at the RAAF base in Adelaide, South Australia on 8 November 2015. The game involved a team of wounded Australian Defence Force (ADF) personnel undergoing rehabilitation at Darwin's soldier Recovery Centre  and a Disability Sports Australia (DSA) team made up of players from South Australia. The game was organized by the ADF, Australian Football League and DSA. The final score was: DSA team 16.8.104 defeated the ADF team 14.5.89.

In April 2015, Prince Harry whilst visiting Darwin, Northern Territory raised the profile of this new sport by participating in a game of wheelchair AFL. The game involved wounded Australian soldiers.

In November 2015, there are plans to create a national league.

Rules
Rules of the game have some similarity to AFL rules for Australian rules football and include:
Game is started by throwing up the ball in the centre of the field.
Six points for a goal, and one point for a behind.
Kicks are replaced with handballs, and handballs replaced with underarm throws.
 A red Sherrin football is used, with the game split into four quarters.
Game is played on a basketball court with plastic posts at each end of the court.
Only five players from each team can be on the field at any given time.
 Team is divided in backs, centres and forwards but only forwards  can score.

See also
Wheelchair sports
Wheelchair rugby league
Wheelchair rugby

References

External links
Prince Harry playing wheelchair AFL in 2015

Sports originating in Australia
Australian Football League
Wheelchair sports